Capitalist Realism: Is There No Alternative? is a 2009 book by British philosopher Mark Fisher. It explores Fisher's concept of "capitalist realism", which he describes as "the widespread sense that not only is capitalism the only viable political and economic system, but also that it is now impossible even to imagine a coherent alternative to it."

The book investigates what Fisher describes as the widespread effects of neoliberal ideology on popular culture, work, education, and mental health in contemporary society. Capitalist Realism was an unexpected success and has influenced a range of writers.

The subtitle refers to British Prime Minister Margaret Thatcher's pro-market slogan "There is no alternative".

Definition
Widely regarded as Mark Fisher's most influential idea, capitalist realism is an ideological framework for viewing capitalism and its effects on politics, economics, and public thought. The name itself is a play on the term "socialist realism". Fisher wrote extensively on the subject and frequently gave interviews with political bloggers and theorists on the subject, which expanded on his definition of the concept.

According to Fisher, the quotation "it is easier to imagine an end to the world than an end to capitalism", attributed to both Fredric Jameson and Slavoj Žižek, encompasses the essence of capitalist realism. Capitalist realism is loosely defined as the predominant conception that capitalism is the only viable economic system, and thus there can be no imaginable alternative. Fisher likens capitalist realism to a "pervasive atmosphere" that affects areas of cultural production, political-economic activity, and general thought.

Capitalist realism as I understand it cannot be confined to art or to the quasi-propagandistic way in which advertising functions. It is more like a pervasive atmosphere, conditioning not only the production of culture but also the regulation of work and education, and acting as a kind of invisible barrier constraining thought and action.

Capitalist realism propagates an idea of the post-political, in which the fall of the Soviet Union both solidified capitalism as the only effective political-economic system and removed the question of capitalism's dissolution from any political consideration. This has subverted the arena of political discussion from one in which capitalism is one of many potential means of operating an economy, to one in which political considerations operate solely within the confines of the capitalist system. Similarly, within the frame of capitalist realism, mainstream anti-capitalist movements shifted away from promoting alternative systems and toward mitigating capitalism's worst effects.

Exponents of capitalist realism do not assert that capitalism is a perfect system, but instead that it is the only system that can operate in a means compatible with human nature and economic law. By promoting the idea that innate human desire is only compatible with capitalism, any other system that is not based on the personal accumulation of wealth and capital is seen as counter to human nature and, by extension, impossible to implement.

Fisher argues that the bank bailouts following the 2008 economic crisis were a quintessential example of capitalist realism in action, reasoning that the bailouts occurred largely because the idea of allowing the banking system to fail was unimaginable to both politicians and the general population. Due to the intrinsic value of banks to the capitalist system, Fisher proposes that the influence of capitalist realism meant that such a failure was never considered an option. As a consequence, Fisher observes, the neoliberal system survived and capitalist realism was further validated. Fisher classifies the current state of capitalist realism in the neoliberal system in the following terms:

The only powerful agents influencing politicians and managers in education are business interests. It's become far too easy to ignore workers and, partly because of this, workers feel increasingly helpless and impotent. The concerted attack on unions by neoliberal interest groups, together with the shift from a Fordist to a post-Fordist organisation of the economy – the move towards casualisation, just-in-time production, globalization – has eroded the power base of unions [and thus the labor force].

Fisher regards capitalist realism as emerging from a purposeful push by the neoliberal right to transform the attitudes of both the general population and the left towards capitalism and specifically the post-Fordist form of capitalism that prevailed throughout the 1980s. The relative inability of the political left to come up with an alternative economic model in response to the rise of neoliberal capitalism and the concurrent Reaganomics era created a vacuum that facilitated the birth of a capitalist realist system. The collapse of the Soviet Union, which Fisher believes represented the only real example of a working non-capitalist system, further cemented the place of capitalist realism both politically and in the general population, and was hailed as the decisive final victory of capitalism. According to Fisher, in a post-Soviet era, unchecked capitalism was able to reframe history into a capitalist narrative in which neoliberalism was the result of a natural progression of history and even embodied the culmination of human development.

Despite the fact that the emergence of capitalist realism is tied to the birth of neoliberalism, Fisher is clear to state that capitalist realism and neoliberalism are separate entities that simply reinforce each other. According to Fisher, capitalist realism has the potential to live past the demise of neoliberal capitalism, though Fisher posits that the opposite would not be true. Capitalist realism is inherently anti-utopian, as it holds that no matter the flaws or externalities, capitalism is the only possible means of operation. Neoliberalism conversely glorifies capitalism by portraying it as providing the means necessary to pursue and achieve near-utopian socioeconomic conditions. In this way, capitalist realism pacifies opposition to neoliberalism's overly positive projections while neoliberalism counteracts the despair and disillusionment central to capitalist realism with its utopian claims.

Effects
According to Fisher, capitalist realism has so captured public thought that the idea of anti-capitalism no longer acts as the antithesis to capitalism. Instead, anti-capitalism is deployed as a means for reinforcing capitalism. This is done through modern media which aims to provide a safe means of entertaining anti-capitalist ideas without actually challenging the system. The lack of coherent alternatives, as presented through the lens of capitalist realism, leads many anti-capitalist movements to cease targeting the end of capitalism, but instead to mitigate its worst effects, often through individual consumption-based activities such as Product Red.

With regard to public views on capitalism, Fisher coined the term "reflexive impotence" which describes a phenomenon where people recognize the flawed nature of capitalism, but believe there are no means of effecting change. According to Fisher, this inaction leads to a self-fulfilling prophecy as well as a negative toll on their mental health.

Fisher identifies a widespread popular desire for a public sphere that operates outside of the state and free from the undesired "add-ons of capital". However, he claims that it is the state alone that has been able to maintain public arenas against the capitalist push for mass privatization. Popular neoliberal thought supports the destruction of public spheres in favor of the privatization of public institutions such as education and health based on the assumption that the market best serves public needs. In this vein, Fisher also raises the idea of "business ontology", which is the capitalist ideology in which purposes and objectives are understood exclusively in business terms. He further postulates that in the case of uniformly business-oriented social conditions there is no place for the public and its only chance at survival is by means of extinguishing the business framework in public services, adding that "if businesses can't be run as businesses, why should public services?" Thus, a frequent topic of Fisher's writing is the future of the public sphere in the face of neoliberal business ontology and what it might look like in absence of a centralized state-run industry.

Realism
The "realism" aspect of capitalist realism and its inspiration—socialist realism—is based on Jacques Lacan's distinction between the Real and "realities", such as capitalist realism, which are ideologically based understandings of the world that reject facts that lie outside of their interpretations. Fisher posits that an appeal to the Real which is suppressed by capitalist realism may begin to deconstruct the pervasiveness of the ideology. Fisher points to areas such as climate change, mental health, and bureaucracy that can be highlighted to show the weaknesses and gaps in capitalist realism. Critic Evan Lang Pandya has characterized Fisher's capital realism as possibly "the only effective framework through which the sins of modern society can be illuminated.".

In the wake of Fisher's work, other critical theorists in academia and the political blogosphere have employed capitalist realism as a theoretical framework.

See also
 Occupational burnout
 Socialist Patients' Collective, West German Marxist collective with motto "Turn illness into a weapon"
 Capitalism and Schizophrenia

References

Further reading
 

Books critical of capitalism
Books about economic inequality
Books about hyperreality
2009 non-fiction books
Marxist theory
Zero Books
Books about mental health
Works about psychiatry